Bulbine alooides ("Rooistorm") is a species of geophytic plant in the genus Bulbine. It is widespread in rocky areas in the southern Cape of South Africa.

Description

The leaves of this geophyte are basal. They are long, slender, lanceolate and channeled. The leaf margins are often hairy.

The vertical inflorescence has many flowers. Each flower is star-like, with six yellow petals that each have a longitudinal stripe down their middle.  Like all Bulbine species, the stamens are distinctively tufted ("bearded").

References

Flora of South Africa
alooides